Kharantsy is a village in the Olkhonsky District of Irkutsk Oblast of Russia, a part of the Khuzhirskiy municipal unit. Located in the middle part of the western coast of Olkhon Island, in 7 km to the north from the municipal unit centre — village Khuzhir. Population: 

In the village there are several hostels for the tourists (Turbazas). In the summer a recreation camp for children is operating.
Near the village a grass airstrip is located that serves flights to Irkutsk and local sightseeing flights.

At the Cape Kharantsy near the village many archaeological findings are made. On its southeastern slope a burial of 11 - 15 century was found; in the western part - the remains of settlements dated 5 millennium BC - 10 century AD. The archaeological findings include a quiver, an iron spear, knives, arrowheads and fragments of pottery.

References

Rural localities in Irkutsk Oblast
Archaeological sites in Siberia
Populated places on Lake Baikal
Olkhon Island